Martin Stahnke (11 November 1888 in Briesen – 28 February 1969 in Frankfurt am Main)  was a German rower. He won the  bronze medal in the men's coxless pair, along with Willy Düskow in the 1908 Summer Olympics.

References

1888 births
1969 deaths
German male rowers
Olympic rowers of Germany
Rowers at the 1908 Summer Olympics
Rowers at the 1912 Summer Olympics
Olympic bronze medalists for Germany
Olympic medalists in rowing
Medalists at the 1908 Summer Olympics